John Henry Gittins (11 November 1893–1956) was an English footballer who played in the Football League for Barnsley and Chesterfield.

References

1893 births
1956 deaths
English footballers
Association football defenders
English Football League players
Barnsley F.C. players
Bentley Colliery F.C. players
Chesterfield F.C. players
Wombwell Town F.C. (1890s) players